Jean-François Rault (born 18 June 1958) is a French former professional racing cyclist. He rode in three editions of the Tour de France and one edition of the Vuelta a España.

Major results

1979
 1st Stage 1 Route de France
1980
 1st Stage 1 Route de France
1981
 1st Stage 4 Tour du Limousin
 1st Stage 3 Tour du Vaucluse
 5th Overall Étoile des Espoirs
1st Stage 2
 5th GP de la Ville de Rennes
 7th Overall Tour d'Indre-et-Loire
1982
 1st GP de la Ville de Rennes
 1st Stage 2 Tour du Limousin
 1st Stage 4 Tour de Corse
 9th GP Ouest–France
1983
 1st Stage 4 Four Days of Dunkirk
 9th GP Ouest–France
 9th GP de la Ville de Rennes
1984
 1st Stage 1 Tour d'Armorique
1985
 1st Stages 5 & 7 Tour of Sweden
1987
 4th Overall Tour d'Armorique
 6th GP Ouest–France
 8th Bordeaux–Paris
 8th GP de la Ville de Rennes
1988
 1st Bordeaux–Paris

References

External links
 

1958 births
Living people
People from Lamballe
French male cyclists
Sportspeople from Côtes-d'Armor
Cyclists from Brittany